Thomas "Tom" McGlinchey (born 1972) is an Irish Gaelic football manager and former dual player of football and hurling.

Career
Born in Mourneabbey, County Cork, McGlinchey played both Gaelic football and hurling for Clyda Rovers.

In retirement from playing McGlinchey became involved in team management and coaching. At club level he coached Ballylanders, while at inter-county level he was manager of the Limerick minor and under-21 teams, as well as the Tipperary and Waterford senior teams.

In October 2018, McGlinchey was appointed manager of the Tipperary under-20s. In February 2021, his successor in that role was appointed.

Honours

Coach
Ballylanders
Limerick Senior Football Championship (1): 2007

References

1972 births
Living people
Clyda Rovers Gaelic footballers
Clyda Rovers hurlers
Dual players
Gaelic football coaches
Gaelic football managers
Gaelic football selectors
Garda Síochána officers